The Bugle Call is a 1927 American silent drama film directed by Edward Sedgwick and starring Jackie Coogan and Claire Windsor, which was released on August 6, 1927.

The Lost Film Files database lists this film as being lost.

Plot 
Billy Randalph (Coogan) who is a young bugler on a frontier cavalry post in the mid-1870s, whose stepmother Alice Tremayne (Windsor) attempts to replace his real mother who only lives in his memory.

Cast 
 Jackie Coogan as Billy Randolph 
 Claire Windsor as Alice Tremayne 
 Herbert Rawlinson as Capt. Randolph 
 Tom O'Brien as Sgt. Doolan 
 Harry Todd as Cpl. Jansen 
 Nelson McDowell as Luke 
 Sarah Padden as Luke's Wife
 Johnny Mack Brown Bit (uncredited)

Crew
 Cedric Gibbons - Art Director
 David Townsend - Set Design
 André-ani - Costume Design

References

External links
 
 

1927 films
1927 drama films
1927 lost films
Silent American drama films
American silent feature films
American black-and-white films
1920s English-language films
Films directed by Edward Sedgwick
Metro-Goldwyn-Mayer films
Lost American films
Lost drama films
1920s American films